Two Girls as Saint Agnes and Saint Dorothea is a painting by the Walloon artist Michaelina Wautier. It was probably painted in the 1650s. 

It now hangs in the Royal Museum of Fine Arts, Antwerp.

References 

Paintings by Michaelina Wautier
1650s paintings